Budgen is a surname. Notable people with the surname include:

Chris Budgen (born 1973), New Zealand rugby union player
Frank Budgen (1882–1971), English painter
Frank Budgen (director) (1954–2015), English commercial director
Henry Budgen (1865–1929), English cricketer
Nicholas Budgen (1937–1998), English politician
 Tom Budgen (born 1985), Dutch professional wrestler better known as Aleister Black
John Budgen founder of Budgens supermarkets in Notting Hill, London (qv).